, which is known in English as The City That Never Sleeps: Shinjuku Shark is a 1993 Japanese film, which was directed by Yōjirō Takita. The movie stars Hiroyuki Sanada, Tadanobu Asano, Tadao Nakamaru.

Plot
Detective Same is out to solve a murder of innocent civilians.

Cast
 Hiroyuki Sanada as Detective Same
 Minako Tanaka as Sho
 Hideo Murota as Momoi
 Eiji Okuda as Kizu
 Shigeru Yazaki as Yabu
 Masayuki Imai as Koda
 Yasuhiro Arai as Yoshikawa
 Tadanobu Asano as Sunagami
 Tadao Nakamaru as Fujimaru

References

External links
 Nemuranai Machi: Shinjuku Same at the Internet Movie Database

1993 films
1990s Japanese-language films
Films directed by Yōjirō Takita
1990s action films
Shochiku films
1990s Japanese films